Asinate Serevi (born 16 April 1995) is a Fijian rugby union player.

Biography 
Serevi made her debut for the United States against Canada at the 2016 Women's Rugby Super Series. She graduated with a degree in Law and Justice from the Central Washington University. She is the daughter of Fiji sevens legend, Waisale Serevi.

Serevi featured for the Eagles at the 2019 Women's Rugby Super Series.

Serevi was named in the Fijiana squad for two test matches against Japan and Australia in 2022. In September she played in a warm up match against Canada. She was also named in the Fijiana squad for the 2021 Rugby World Cup.

References

External links 

 Eagles Profile

Living people
1995 births
Female rugby union players
Fiji women's international rugby union players
United States women's international rugby union players